Oosterschelde is a three-masted schooner from the Netherlands, built in 1918. She is the largest restored Dutch freightship and the only remaining Dutch three-masted topsail schooner. Her home port is Rotterdam.

As a freighter with a deadweight of 400 tons, she transported mainly clay, stone and wood, but also herring, bran, potatoes, straw and bananas. In the 1930s, a heavier diesel engine was installed and some sail-rigging was removed (including the aft mast). In 1939, she was sold to a Danish shipping company and, rebaptised Fuglen II, became one of the most modern ships in the Danish fleet. In 1954, she was sold to a Swede, renamed Sylvan and thoroughly rebuilt to a modern motorised coaster.

In 1988, she was brought back to the Netherlands. She had always been maintained well, but restoration to the original state turned out too expensive for private funding. So a foundation collected money from various sources, partly by selling shares in the ship. Restoration lasted from 1990 to 1992, with the help of her last Dutch captain, Jan Kramer, and three maritime museums to ensure authenticity.

From 1996 through 1998 she made a trip around the world (route: Red Sea, Indonesia, Hong Kong, Japan, Australia, New-Zealand, Cape Horn, Antarctic, Açores). Maintenance is paid for through paying passengers and company presentations. A new voyage around the world started on November 3, 2012 and ended in May 2014. This brought the ship to Cabo Verde, Brazil, Cape Of Good Hope, Mauritius, Cape Leeuwin, New Zealand, Cape Horn and Antarctica.

In October 2013 Oosterschelde participated in the International Fleet Review 2013 in Sydney, Australia.

See also
 List of schooners

External links

Official site in English

Schooners
Three-masted ships
1918 ships
Ships built in the Netherlands